Princeton Kwong (born November 14, 1989 in Fremont, California) is an American figure skater who represented the United States as a single skater.  He is the 2004 U.S. novice national gold medalist, and has won two bronze medals in the 2004–2005 ISU Junior Grand Prix, held in Long Beach, USA and Chemnitz, Germany respectively. 

He holds a bachelor's degree from Princeton University.

Competitive highlights

Personal
He is the son of Raymond and Emma Kwong and the older brother of Samuel Kwong, an American nationally ranked saber fencer.

References

1989 births
Living people
American male single skaters
People from Fremont, California
People from Pleasanton, California
People from Los Altos Hills, California
American sportspeople of Chinese descent